The yellow-legged thrush (Turdus flavipes) is a songbird of northern and eastern South America and the Caribbean.

Taxonomy
In recent times, it is increasingly often placed in the genus Turdus again, however some taxonomists place this species in the genus Platycichla based on morphology. The South American Classification Committee of the American Ornithologists' Union places it in the genus Turdus, as does the International Ornithological Committee.

Description
Both sexes have yellow legs and eye-ring. The male has a yellow bill and its plumage is usually black with a slate-grey back and lower underparts. However, the hue of the grey areas varies, and the male of one of the five subspecies, P. f. xanthoscelus of Tobago, is all-black, resembling the male Eurasian blackbird (Turdus merula). Females have a dull bill, warm brown upperparts and paler underparts. The juvenile male is brownish with black wings and tail, while the juvenile female resemble the adult female, but is duller, flecked with orange above and spotted and barred with dark brown below.

The song of the male is musical phrases, sreee, sree, sreee, again somewhat resembling that of the Eurasian blackbird, but sometimes including some imitation of other birds songs. The typical call is a sharp srip and a peculiar seeet given in alarm.

Distribution and habitat
It has a highly disjunct distribution. One population breeds in northern Colombia, Venezuela, far northern Brazil, Trinidad, Tobago, and Margarita, as well as parts of the Pakaraima Mountains in western Guyana (including as it seems Mount Roraima). A second population occurs in eastern Brazil, eastern Paraguay, and far northeastern Argentina. The Argentine subpopulation is partially migratory, being resident in the northern part, while southernmost breeders spend the Austral winter further north. Some populations in northern South America also take part in local movements, but these are not well understood.

The habitat of this small thrush is rainforest, secondary woodland, and overgrown plantations. It is mainly a species of highlands up to  ASL, but locally it occurs down to near sea level.

Ecology
The yellow-legged thrush mainly feeds in trees and bushes, infrequently on the ground, and mostly eats fruits and berries, e.g., Melastomataceae. It rarely if ever attends mixed-species feeding flocks, as its habit of keeping to the tree-tops makes it rarely worthwhile to join such conspicuous groups.

The nest is a lined shallow cup of twigs on a bank or amongst rocks. Two or three reddish-blotched green or blue eggs are laid.

It is fairly common in most of its range, and therefore listed as Least Concern by the IUCN. However, the yellow-legged thrush is a shy species, and the female in particular is difficult to see, since she does not sing and has a cryptic coloration.

Footnotes

References

 Clement, Peter & Hathaway, Ren (2000): Thrushes. Christopher Helm, London. 
 ffrench, Richard; O'Neill, John Patton & Eckelberry, Don R. (1991): A guide to the birds of Trinidad and Tobago (2nd edition). Comstock Publishing, Ithaca, N.Y.. 
 Hilty, Steven L. (2003): Birds of Venezuela. Christopher Helm, London. 
 Machado, C.G. (1999): A composição dos bandos mistos de aves na Mata Atlântica da Serra de Paranapiacaba, no sudeste brasileiro [Mixed flocks of birds in Atlantic Rain Forest in Serra de Paranapiacaba, southeastern Brazil]. Revista Brasileira de Biologia 59(1): 75-85 [Portuguese with English abstract].  PDF fulltext
 O'Shea, B.J.; Milensky, Christopher M.; Claramunt, Santiago; Schmidt, Brian K.; Gebhard, Christina A.; Schmitt, C. Gregory & Erskine, Kristine T. (2007): New records for Guyana, with description of the voice of Roraiman Nightjar Caprimulgus whitelyi. Bull. B.O.C. 127(2): 118–128. PDF fulltext
 Strewe, Ralf & Navarro, Cristobal (2004): New and noteworthy records of birds from the Sierra Nevada de Santa Marta region, north-eastern Colombia. Bull. B.O.C. 124(1): 38–51. PDF fulltext

yellow-legged thrush
Birds of Colombia
Birds of Venezuela
Birds of Trinidad and Tobago
Birds of the Caribbean
Birds of the Atlantic Forest
yellow-legged thrush
yellow-legged thrush